No. 3/No. 13 (Magenta, Black, Green on Orange) is an oil on canvas painting of American artist Mark Rothko created in 1949. The painting is composed of symmetrical rectangular blocks of magenta, black and green colors on orange background. No.3/No.13 (Magenta, Black, Green on Orange) was also influenced by the loss of Rothko's mother, who died in October 1948. It is held at the Museum of Modern Art, in New York.

Description
The blocks of color are narrowly separated soaring against a colored ground. Closely related tones of the blocks seems barely to emerge from the ground, while the green bar vibrates against the orange background, creating an optical flicker. In the painting two different spatial scenarios present themselves: either a closed aesthetic ecosystem or a fragment of a larger environment, one that surrounds the viewer.

Rothko belonged to the New York School, was also known as Abstract Expressionist, shaped by the Great Depression and World War II. No.3/No.13 (Magenta, Black, Green on Orange) is one of the early Mark Rothko's works produced within the color field movement. It is an early example of a compositional structure that Rothko explored for more than twenty years. Most of Rothko's color field paintings were created during periods of extreme happiness or sadness that fueled his innovative work and impacted the color schemes, becoming darker and darker over a period of several decades.

Exhibitions
Rothko exhibited No.3/No.13 (Magenta, Black, Green on Orange) and his other color field paintings at Betty Parsons Gallery, New York.

References

1949 paintings
Paintings by Mark Rothko
Paintings in the collection of the Museum of Modern Art (New York City)